Sustrans is a United Kingdom-based walking, wheeling and cycling charity, and the custodian of the National Cycle Network.

Its flagship project is the National Cycle Network, which has created  of signed cycle routes throughout the United Kingdom including  of traffic-free paths. The rest of the network is on previously existing and mostly minor roads, in which motor traffic will be encountered.

Sustrans works with schools to encourage active travel (cycling, walking or scooting) among students. It also works with employers and local authorities. It administers several thousand volunteers who contribute their time to the charity in numerous ways, such as cleaning and maintaining the National Cycle Network, enhancing biodiversity along the routes, leading walks and rides and supporting communities to improve their air quality.

In Scotland, Sustrans has established partnership teams, embedding officers in local councils as well as NHS Scotland, the Scottish Environment Protection Agency, Scottish Natural Heritage and Transport for Edinburgh.

History

Sustrans was formed in Bristol in July 1977 as Cyclebag by a group of cyclists and environmentalists, motivated by emerging doubts about the desirability of over-dependence on the private car, following the 1973 oil crisis, and the almost total lack of specific provision for cyclists in most British cities, in contrast to some other European countries.

A decade earlier, the Beeching Axe closed many British railways that the government considered underused and too costly. One such railway was the former Midland Railway line between central Bristol and Bath, closed in favour of the more direct, former Great Western Railway between the cities. Led by John Grimshaw, Cyclebag leased part of the old route and together with many volunteers and the help of Avon County Council (Bristol and Bath were then part of the County of Avon) turned it into its first route, the Bristol & Bath Railway Path.

In the early 1980s, when unemployment rose, the organisation took advantage of government schemes to provide temporary employment to build similar "green routes". British Waterways and Cyclebag collaborated to improve towpaths along some canals, which resulted in increased use of the towpaths, especially by cyclists.

In 1983, the charity Sustrans was founded. It had 11 directors (trustees, members and board members of the charity) chosen by the existing board. The executive board was composed of the chief executive, John Grimshaw, and one of the two company secretaries.

By the early 1990s, Sustrans had a growing number of supporters, and the network of national routes was emerging. In 1995, it was granted £43.5 million from the Millennium Lottery Fund to extend the National Cycle Network to smaller towns and rural areas, as well as launch the "Safe Routes to Schools" project, based on earlier state projects in Denmark.

The five-year project, Connect2 was launched in 2006, and it aimed at improving local travel in 79 communities by creating new walking and cycling routes. In 2007 it received £50 million from the Big Lottery's 'Living Landmarks; The People's Millions' competition, following a public vote.

In 2015, Sustrans ran the Campaign for Safer Streets, which encouraged people to write to Prime Minister David Cameron to encourage him to commit to funding safer walking and cycling routes to schools.

In October 2015, Sustrans released its first Bike Life report. It was a survey of residents in seven UK cities, undertaken in conjunction with local councils and transport authorities, attempting to assess the current state of cycling in the UK. It covered areas such as safety, provision of cycling infrastructure and people's attitudes towards cycling.

Funding
The National Cycle Network was the first project to receive Millennium Commission funding in 1995. Sustrans currently has many sources of funding, and in the 2004/05 financial year, its income was £23.6 million: £2.1 million from supporters' donations, £8.5 million came from the Department for Transport and a further £2.5 million from the National Opportunities Fund specifically for the Safe Routes projects. Additional funding comes from charitable grants and trusts, local government and income from the sales of maps and books. More recently as a result of the COVID-19 Lockdown a total of £30 million of Spaces for People funding has been granted to Sustrans to support local authorities and statutory bodies in Scotland to provide safe walking and cycling infrastructure as the country transitions out of lockdown.

National Cycle Network

The National Cycle Network was officially opened in June 2000, when  had been completed, although some routes had been open for over a decade. In 2005 the network reached . In urban areas, almost 20% of the network is free from motor traffic, though these sections can account for up to 80% of use. The more rural parts of the network see less motor traffic and are used primarily for leisure cycling.

Sustrans estimated that in 2005, the network carried 232,000,000 journeys by all classes of non-motorised users. In 2010, the figure had risen to over 420,000,000 journeys. The data collected by Sustrans to compile monitoring reports, from traffic counters and user surveys, showed that National Cycle Network usage is predominantly urban and on traffic-free sections. Furthermore, surveys show that only 35% of usage on urban sections of the NCN is for leisure purposes.

In 2018, Sustrans published the National Cycle Network Review: Paths for Everyone report which reviewed the quality and usage of the Network and set out a vision for its future. It estimated that in 2017–2018, 4.4 million users carried out 786 million cycling and walking trips on the Network.

Criticism
Sustrans has opponents within organisations that wish to reduce road haulage and motor travel by promoting the expansion of the modern railway network. It has also received criticism from members of the heritage railway movement. It has been accused of being uncompromising on route sharing; an example is the planned section of the Bodmin & Wenford Railway between Boscarne Junction and Wadebridge.

It also has a history of going back on its own policies with regard to sustainable transport. In 2000, several mainline railways were full to capacity, yet requests by EWS and English China Clays to reopen lost rail links for freight paths such as the former Weedon to Leamington Spa line were refused by the charity. Sustrans refused to support the application unless the rail promoter provided an alternative cycle track; EWS responded it was an uneconomic provision for both reopening and building replacement pathway expenses. Objections by Sustrans allegedly mean that freight now has to continue to move by road through the local villages.

Sustrans have occasionally been criticised by other cycling organisations and activists over allegedly giving approval to cycle facilities regarded by critics as inadequate or dangerous, allowing local councils and similar bodies to reject criticism by pointing out that Sustrans have approved of the design being questioned. In 2013, for example, the Cycling Embassy of Great Britain criticised Sustrans for the extensive use of "shared use" provision—in which cycle routes are placed on pavements and footpaths without separation from pedestrians—in designs that Sustrans prepared for London. In 2016, the University of the West of England's Centre for Transport and Society identified shared use designs, and in particular Sustrans Design Guidance which encouraged such designs, as a source of conflict between pedestrians and cyclists and a cause for frustration among those campaigning for better cycling infrastructure provision.

References

External links

 
 
 Guardian article about Bike Life report 2015
 Sustrans Connect2 Official Home Page

Specific routes
 The Taff Trail (NCN 8)
 Valley Rides By Tony Gibbs (NCN 8)

Cycling organisations in the United Kingdom
National Cycle Network
Organisations based in Bristol
Political advocacy groups in the United Kingdom
Transport advocacy groups of the United Kingdom
1977 establishments in the United Kingdom
Transport charities based in the United Kingdom